The Truxtun Bowl is a Chinese porcelain punch bowl made for Captain Thomas Truxtun in 1794.  Captain Truxtun is noted for his command of the frigate  during the Quasi-War with France in 1798 to 1800.  Truxtun had served on privateers during the American Revolutionary War.  After the Revolution, as a Philadelphia merchant captain, he was a pioneer of American trade with China.  In 1794, Truxtun was appointed one of six captains to oversee the building of the United States Navy's first frigates.  That year, to illustrate a book he was publishing on navigation, he asked naval constructor, Josiah Fox, who would play a part in designing these ships, for a drawing of a 44-gun frigate.  Truxtun commissioned two punch bowls featuring Fox's drawing.  One of these is in the U.S. Navy Museum at the Washington Navy Yard in Washington, D.C.  The other bowl, presented to President George Washington, is in Washington's home of Mount Vernon.

External links
 Truxtun of the Constellation • by Eugene S. Ferguson
 
 Browse Search - OPAC Discovery
 https://n94032.eos-intl.net/N94032/OPAC/Search/AdvancedSearch.aspx?TaskCode=928106&TitleListPageSize=20&CatLevel0Value=&CatLevel1Value=&CatLevel2Value=&CatLevel3Value=&CatLevel4Value=Start

Individual pieces of porcelain
Chinese ceramic works